Romulus is the debut full-length album by Canadian death metal band Ex Deo. The album was released on June 19, 2009, through Nuclear Blast Records. The album was recorded with producer and Kataklysm guitarist Jean-Francois Dagenais.

The album title refers to Romulus, the traditional founder and, according to the legend, the first king of Rome.

Recording and production 
On December 5, 2008, the band announced they signed to Nuclear Blast Records for a record deal. This was the beginning of the creation of the forthcoming album. Shortly after, on December 31, 2008, the band announced they would air the first track of the upcoming album on January 11, 2009. The first track they aired was a demo version of Cry Havoc, followed by enthusiastic feedback from their fans on their MySpace page.

Since February 20 the band started a weekly studio blog to keep their fans in the loop while they were working on the album. The blogs also included a special section called Do you know Rome?, which contained a weekly historical fact about the Roman Empire. In total there were about 5 fact posted on their MySpace page. By the time they posted their second studio update the band already recorded most of the music and even completed the song Storm the Gates of Alesia. During the time they posted their third studio update Iacono announced he completed the vocals for the album.

In March the band announced both the album's release dates and track list. They also announced the album was completely recorded.

On April 22 the band announced that Nergal, Karl Sanders and Obsidian C. would make guest appearances on the album.

The band also posted another track called Legio XIII on their Myspace page. A song in honor of Rome's most devastating and lethal legion ever assembled; the 13th Legion which helped bring Caesar to power." And on June 15, 2009 the band announced they were streaming the entire album on their MySpace page, just before it was released on June 19, 2009.

Track listing 
All songs written by Maurizio Iacono.

Notes
  A video for the title-track Romulus was shot. It was recorded in Belgrade, Serbia by director Stanimir "Staca" Lukic

Personnel
Ex Deo
 Maurizio Iacono - vocals
 Stéphane Barbe - guitar
 Jean-François Dagenais - guitar, producer
 François Mongrain - bass guitar
 Jonathan Leduc - keyboards
 Max Duhamel - drums

Guest musicians
 Adam Darski – vocals on Storm the Gates of Alesia
 Karl Sanders – guitars on The Final War (Battle of Actium)
 Arnt Ove Grønbech – guitars on Cruor Nostri Abbas

Music video
On January 30, 2010 the band announced they were going to shoot a video for the track Romulus in early March. The video was shot and directed by renowned director Stanimir "Staca" Lukic in Belgrade, Serbia.

In March Iacono announced the video for Romulus was shot and that he was very happy with the outcome.

Though the video for Romulus was already completed in March, it didn't air until May 12.  But the band received tremendous feedback from their fans on their MySpace page shortly after.

Another music video was shot for the track "The Final War (Battle of Actium)".

References

External links
 Ex Deo on Myspace
 Romulus E-Card at Nuclear Blast
 Encyclopaedia Metallum

2009 debut albums
Ex Deo albums
Nuclear Blast albums